Cyrus Northrop Memorial Auditorium (commonly known as Northrop Auditorium or simply Northrop) is a performing arts venue at the University of Minnesota in Minneapolis, Minnesota. It is named in honor of Cyrus Northrop, the university's second president.  Various events are held within the building, including concerts, ballet performances, lectures, and graduations.

Northrop anchors the north end of Northrop Mall, a grassy area at the center of campus that is bordered by the university's physics, mathematics, chemistry, and administration buildings, plus Walter Library. Coffman Memorial Union sits at the south end of the mall, opposite Northrop across Washington Avenue.

History

Construction
Northrop Auditorium was built between 1928 and 1929 as part of a major university expansion project. An auditorium had been part of Cass Gilbert's plan for Northrop Mall dating back to 1908, but it wasn't until 1922, when Cyrus Northrop died, that the university took serious interest in the project. Northrop Auditorium was dedicated both as a memorial to Cyrus Northrop and to the veterans of World War I.  University officials raised $665,000 in student pledges, at an average of $80 per student, in a six-month period. It took three more years of fundraising and debate over the size and form of the auditorium before the project came to full fruition. The Greater University Corporation finally submitted a request to have the plans drawn up in the fall of 1926, with a cost not to exceed $1 million.

Frederick Mann, chair of the university's School of Architecture, submitted a building concept that featured a classical portico with pediment.  However, the amount of ornamentation and sculptural carving required for the design would have exceeded cost limits and appeared incongruous with the more understated buildings on the sides of the mall. Project architect Clarence H. Johnston Sr. thus toned down Mann's design by making the pediment flat and by turning the roof behind it into a gable. Johnston borrowed some design elements from the portico of the Low Memorial Library at Columbia University for the revised design. The proportions of the frieze and attic, the Ionic order, and the count of ten columns matched those from the Low Library, but the monumental gable parapet had no resemblance to the library's dome. Plans were completed in February 1928, after much debate. The inscription on the attic was not decided upon until after the building was ready for occupancy, even though Johnston had requested the inscription be included in the building contract. The inscription reads: "The University of Minnesota: Founded in the Faith that Men are Ennobled by Understanding; Dedicated to the Advancement of Learning and the Search for Truth; Devoted to the Instruction of Youth and the Welfare of the State." 

Northrop's grand opening occurred on October 22, 1929 with a performance by the Minneapolis Symphony Orchestra. The celebration continued with a performance by the Boston Symphony on October 30 and the "Alumni and State Program" on November 15.

Programming
Since its construction, Northrop has been frequently used for a variety of university functions. The auditorium was purportedly designed in 1929 to seat the entire student population in the event of mass assembly. It became the primary venue for university graduations when it hosted its first graduating class in 1930. Free, public lectures were held at Northrop on a weekly basis until 1969 and less frequently through the 1970s. The auditorium was also used as a meeting place for large classes from 1959 until the 1990s.

Dance has been a part of Northrop's programming since Mary Wigman first performed on its stage in 1932. However, it was not until the 1970s that it became Northrop's signature marketing niche. The Northrop Dance Season debuted in 1970–1971 and continues to the present day. The size of Northrop's stage makes it one of the only facilities in the region capable of accommodating major dance productions.

Pop and rock concerts seldom occurred at Northrop during the first 45 years of its history. However, they became more frequent when the university's Board of Regents reversed a decades-old booking policy in 1974. A now-infamous 1990 performance by the B-52's is remembered for causing part of the auditorium's plaster ceiling to collapse.

Several organizations have been based at Northrop over the course of its history. The building housed the Minneapolis Symphony Orchestra from the time of construction until 1973. The Weisman Art Museum was located within Northrop until a separate building was built in 1993. The University of Minnesota Marching Band regularly used the building for practice until 2009.

A sizable pipe organ was installed in the building between 1932 and 1936. With 6,982 pipes comprising 108 ranks and 81 speaking stops, it is the largest pipe organ in the Upper Midwest and the third largest Aeolian-Skinner pipe organ extant in the United States. The organ was removed from the building in 2011, but was restored and reinstalled between 2016 and 2017. The organ's return was celebrated with a pair of inaugural concerts on October 12 and 13, 2018.

Renovation

After eighty years of continuous use and timely decay, Northrop was in dire need of rehabilitation by the 2010s. An extensive interior renovation finally began in February 2011. With a design team led by architects Tim Carl and Jim Moore of HGA, the renovation project aimed to retain the building's historic character while making it a state-of-the-art performance space. The renovation reduced seating in the main theater from 4,847 to 2,692 and greatly improved sight lines and acoustics. The new design allowed for a second theater space with seating for 168 to be added on the fourth floor. Offices for the University Honors Program and Institute for Advanced Study, a backstage rehearsal studio, and a main floor cafe were also included in the new design. Important design features such as the proscenium arch and historic columns were preserved as part of the project. Memorial Hall, the building's historic lobby, received a full restoration.

Northrop reopened to the public on April 4, 2014. During the grand reopening celebration, university provost Karen Hanson delivered a speech addressing the history of Northrop and her vision for the future. Conversation with members of the audience produced a number of stories, including one about the ghost of a former stage manager. The American Ballet Theatre subsequently rechristened the stage with a performance of Giselle. Since then, Northrop has continued to serve as a center for art, entertainment, and various university functions. Dance performances and university graduations are held in the building regularly. Lectures and concerts are also common. It further serves as a popular study space for students during the day.

Northrop was formally listed in the National Register of Historic Places as a contributing property to the Northrop Mall Historic District in January 2018.

In popular culture
Exterior shots of Northrop can be seen in the 1972 film The Heartbreak Kid.
Northrop was used as a filming location for the 1994 film With Honors. In the film, Northrop stands in as the Widener Library at Harvard University.
Exterior shots of Northrop can be seen in the 2014 film Dear White People.
Northrop notably hosted the 7th annual NFL Honors awards show prior to Super Bowl LII in 2018. The event was televised on NBC.

Notable concerts
Igor Stravinsky
Louis Armstrong
Leonard Bernstein – 1945; 1947
Marian Anderson
Ella Fitzgerald
Van Cliburn – 1968
Grateful Dead – 1971
Peter, Paul and Mary
Pete Seeger
Joni Mitchell – 1976
Carole King
Bob Marley – 1978; 1979
Elton John – 1979
Frank Zappa – 1981; 1984
Bette Midler – 1983
James Taylor – 1986; 2002
The B-52's – 1990
Aretha Franklin – 1992
G3 Tour Steve Vai, Joe Satriani and Eric Johnson – 1997
Bruce Springsteen – 1996; 2005
Sonny Rollins – 1998
Kenny G
Dolly Parton
Barry Manilow
Prince – 2000
Van Morrison – 2004; 2007
Sheryl Crow
John Mellencamp
Paul Simon – 2006
Neil Young – 2007; 2019
Bob Dylan – 2008
John Legend – 2008; 2017
Kraftwerk – 2015
Iggy Pop – 2016
Patti Smith – 2017
Diana Ross – 2017
Thom Yorke – 2018

Other notable events
Mary Wigman – January 12, 1932
Langston Hughes – 1935
Arnold Toynbee – 1955
Martin Luther King Jr. – October 16, 1959; January 28, 1963
Robert Frost
Metropolitan Opera – multiple dates
Buckminster Fuller – 1973
Alvin Ailey, American Ballet Theatre, and New York City Ballet – multiple dates
Martha Graham
Mikhail Baryshnikov
Robin Williams – April 16, 2002
The Dalai Lama
Presidents Jimmy Carter, George H. W. Bush, Bill Clinton, and Joe Biden
 Former U.S. Vice President Walter Mondale and former President of Ireland Mary Robinson - October 20, 2001
Supreme Court Justices Antonin Scalia, Sonia Sotomayor, John Roberts, Elena Kagan, and Sandra Day O'Connor
Sherman Alexie
NFL Honors – February 3, 2018
Jane Goodall
Gloria Steinem
Walter Mondale memorial service - May 1, 2022

Photo gallery

References

External links
 Northrop
 

University of Minnesota
Buildings and structures in Minneapolis
Concert halls in Minnesota
Tourist attractions in Minneapolis